Denis Ó Connmhaigh also recorded as Denis O'Cahan or in Latin as Dionysius was an Irish Roman Catholic clergyman in the  15th century: he was appointed Bishop of Kilfenora on 17 November 1434 and consecrated on 26 December that year; resigned on 12 December 1491.

References

Bibliography

 
 
 
 

Bishops of Kilfenora